Can-Am Speedway is a -mile dirt oval raceway located in La Fargeville, Town of Orleans, New York.  Located just a few miles from the Thousand Islands on New York State Route 411, it draws competitors and fans from both sides of the Canada–United States border.

History
The Can-Am Speedway was built in 1974 by an Evans Mills, NY real estate broker, Leslie W. Brown.  The track lasted one year under this ownership and Brown filed for bankruptcy.

Early in 1975, a group of Watertown Speedway investors purchased the track, that consisted of Bob Thurston Sr., Douglas Atkinson, and Thomas Coughlin.  This partnership lasted for several seasons. In 1981, Bob Thurston Sr. bought out Mr. Atkinson and Mr. Coughlin, and became the sole owner.

The Thurston family continued to own the track during the glory years of the 80s and 90s.  Thurston was responsible for bringing Can-Am under the DIRTcar racing banner during the winter of 1982-83.  The Thurston family did a remarkable job with the speedway, even after the rebuilding of the VIP towers after a vicious storm hit the track in 1995.  The Thurston's faced some pretty tough decisions at the time, but decided to repair the damage.  With the help of many people around the racing community, the track was back up and running in just three weeks.  The Thurston family owned the speedway until the late in the 2000 season.

John Wight, of Baldwinsville, NY purchased the track in the summer of 2000.  Wight introduced the Big Block Modifieds as the top class at the speedway.  Wight continued ownership of the speedway, even though attendance and car counts were down from previous seasons.  Wight also owned and sponsored cars driven by Billy Decker, Pat Ward and Pat Obrien.  Wight would eventually sell the track to Charlie and Billy Caprara from the F.X. Caprara car companies late in the 2003 season.  Wight would continue to me a major player in racing with ownership of both the Brewerton and Fulton Speedways in upstate New York, as well as a Big Block Modified team still consisting of Ward, and Larry Wight, his son. 

Caprara's ownership of the Can-Am Speedway saw several changes to the speedway.  The track became known as Caprara Bros. Can-Am Motorsports Park.  The Caprara's also operated the Thunder Alley Speed Park, which is just a few miles down the road from Can-Am.  

The Caprara's continued to own Can-Am through the end of the 2009 season.  Just a couple of months into the off season, the track was sold to longtime racer, and Rochester businessman, Tiger Chapman.  Chapman was originally from nearby Cape Vincent, New York, and still has a home in the town.

In 2017, operations returned to the Caprara family, and the 358 Modifieds headlined the Saturday night events.  

In December 2017 it was announced that the Can-Am Speedway had been sold to driver Tyler Bartlett.  The track will be sanctioned by DIRTcar.  Bartlett will continue to compete in weekly races, while Bobby Thurston Jr. will return as general manager.

References

External links
 CanAm Motorsports
 DIRT Motorsports

Dirt oval race tracks in the United States
Sports venues in Jefferson County, New York
Motorsport venues in New York (state)
1974 establishments in New York (state)
Sports venues completed in 1974